Nikolay Aleksandrovich Burobin (born May 25, 1937) is a Russian former volleyball player who competed for the Soviet Union in the 1964 Summer Olympics.

He was born in Pushkino, Moscow Oblast.

In 1964, he was part of the Soviet team which won the gold medal in the Olympic tournament. He played eight matches.

External links
 
 

1937 births
Living people
People from Pushkino
Soviet men's volleyball players
Olympic volleyball players of the Soviet Union
Volleyball players at the 1964 Summer Olympics
Olympic gold medalists for the Soviet Union
Olympic medalists in volleyball
Russian men's volleyball players
Medalists at the 1964 Summer Olympics
Sportspeople from Moscow Oblast